Mangapapa River may refer to:

Mangapapa River (Bay of Plenty) - a river of the western Bay of Plenty Region of New Zealand's North Island 
Mangapapa River (Manawatu-Wanganui) - a river of the Manawatu-Wanganui Region of New Zealand's North Island

See also
 Mangapapa for the suburb of Gisborne, New Zealand.
 Manganui River (disambiguation)
 Mangaone River (disambiguation)